In geometric topology, Busemann functions are used to study the large-scale geometry of geodesics in Hadamard spaces and in particular Hadamard manifolds (simply connected complete Riemannian manifolds of nonpositive curvature). They are named after Herbert Busemann, who introduced them; he gave an extensive treatment of the topic in his 1955 book "The geometry of geodesics".

Definition and elementary properties 

Let  be a metric space. A geodesic ray is a path  which minimizes distance everywhere along its length. i.e., for all , 
 
Equivalently, a ray is an isometry from the "canonical ray" (the set  equipped with the Euclidean metric) into the metric space X.

Given a ray γ, the Busemann function  is defined by

It is immediate from the triangle inequality that

so that  is uniformly continuous. More specifically, the above estimate above shows that

Busemann functions are Lipschitz functions with constant 1.

By Dini's theorem, the functions  tend to  uniformly on compact sets as t tends to infinity.

Example: Poincaré disk 

Let  be the unit disk in the complex plane with the Poincaré metric

where the term in brackets on the right hand side is the Poisson kernel for the unit disk and  corresponds to the radial geodesic  from the origin towards ,
.

The formula above also completely determines the Busemann function by Möbius invariance.

Busemann functions on a Hadamard space

In a Hadamard space, where any two points are joined by a unique geodesic segment, the function  is convex, i.e. convex on geodesic segments . Explicitly this means that if  is the point which divides  in the ratio , then .

Busemann functions are convex on Hadamard spaces.

Let . Since  is parametrised by arclength, Alexandrov's first comparison theorem for Hadamard spaces implies that the function  is convex. Hence for 

Thus

so that

Letting t tend to ∞, it follows that

so convergence is uniform on bounded sets.

This geodesic cuts the boundary of the closed ball  at the point . Thus if , there is a point  with  such that .

This condition persists for Busemann functions.

By the Lipschitz condition . To prove the assertion, it suffices to show that , i.e. . On the other hand,  is the uniform limit on any closed ball of functions . Let .

so that  is a Cauchy sequence. By uniqueness it follows that  and hence , as required.

Uniform limits. The same argument also shows that the class of functions which satisfy the same three conditions (being convex, Lipschitz and having minima on closed balls) is closed under taking uniform limits on bounded sets.

Comment. Note that, since any closed convex subset of a Hadamard subset of a Hadamard space is also a Hadamard space, any closed ball in a Hadamard space is a Hadamard space. The closed unit ball of a Hilbert space gives an explicit example which is not a proper metric space.

In particular this holds for each Busemann function.

Hence . Uniqueness implies that these geodesics segments coincide for arbitrary  and therefore that  extends to a geodesic ray with the stated property.

If , then the geodesic ray  starting at  satisfies .

To prove the first assertion, it is enough to check this for  sufficiently large. Therefore, . Hence  .

In particular . It suffices to show that . Then

so that

Hence . Similarly . Hence  on the level surface of  containing . Moreover, by boundedness, . For general , if , take  such that  and set . Then , where . But then , so that . Hence , as required. Similarly if , take
 such that . Let . Then , so . Hence , as required.

Finally there are necessary and sufficient conditions for two geodesics to define the same Busemann function up to constant:

On a Hadamard space, the Busemann functions of two geodesic rays  and  differ by a constant if and only if .

Shifting the argument of one of the geodesics by a constant, it may be assumed that , say. Then  and similarly . Hence .

Now suppose that . Then . Hence . By the previous result  and  differ by a constant; so  and  differ by a constant.

To summarise, the above results give the following characterisation of Busemann functions on a Hadamard space:

THEOREM. On a Hadamard space, the following conditions on a function  are equivalent:

 is a Busemann function.

Bordification of a Hadamard space

If  is a metric space, Gromov's bordification can be defined as follows. The space  can be topologised by the seminorms , the topology of uniform convergence on bounded sets. The seminorms are finite by the Lipschitz conditions. It is give by the metric .

The space  is embedded into  by sending  to the function . Then  is metrisable, since  is, and contains  as an open subset; moreover bordifications arising from different choices of basepoint are naturally homeomorphic. Let .

When  is a Hadamard space, Gromov's ideal boundary  can be realised explicitly as "asymptotic limits" of geodesic rays using Busemann functions.

. This is a convex function. So for each ,  tends towards 0. Hence, by the first comparison theorem for geodesic triangles,  is small. Conversely suppose that for fixed  and  sufficiently large  tends to 0. Then from the above  satisfies

For a fixed ball , fix  so that .  The claim is then an immediate consequence of the inequality for geodesic segments in a Hadamard space, since

Busemann functions on a Hadamard manifold 

This geodesic cuts the boundary of the closed ball  at the two points . Thus if , there are points  with  such that . By continuity this condition persists for Busemann functions:

The Lipschitz condition shows that the values of  there differ by at most . The Lipschitz condition on  then immediately implies  and  must be the unique points in  maximizing and minimizing . Then the corresponding points  and  lie in a closed ball so admit convergent subsequences.

The above result holds more generally in a Hadamard space.

Then  . Indeed, let , so that . Then

The assertion on the outer terms follows from the first variation formula for arclength, but can be deduced directly as follows. Let 

 
with  uniformly bounded. Then

The same method works for the other terms.

Hence it follows that  is a  function with  dual to the vector field , so that .

THEOREM. On a Hadamard manifold  the following conditions on a continuous function  are equivalent:
  is a Busemann function.
  is a convex, Lipschitz function with constant 1, and for each  in  there are points  at a distance  from  such that .

It has already been proved that (1) implies (2).

The arguments above show mutatis mutandi that (2) implies (3).

It therefore remains to show that (3) implies (1). Indeed, if , then

so that . In particular . To prove (1), it suffices to show that .

In this case the geodesic is just .

so that

Hence  on the level surface of  containing . For general  take  such that  and set . Then , where . But then , so that . Hence , as required.

Note that this argument could be shortened using the fact that two Busemann functions  and  differ by a constant if and only if the corresponding geodesic rays satisfy . Indeed, all the geodesics defined by the flow  satisfy the latter condition, so differ by constants. Since along any of these geodesics  is linear with derivative 1,  must differ from these Busemann functions by constants.

Compactification of a proper Hadamard space
 defined a compactification of a Hadamard manifold  which uses Busemann functions. Their construction, which can be extended more generally to proper (i.e. locally compact) Hadamard spaces, gives an explicit geometric realisation of a compactification defined by Gromov—by adding an "ideal boundary"—for the more general class of proper metric spaces , those for which every closed ball is compact. Note that, since any Cauchy sequence is contained in a closed ball, any proper metric space is automatically complete. The ideal boundary is a special case of the ideal boundary for a metric space. In the case of Hadamard spaces, this agrees with the space of geodesic rays emanating from any fixed point described using Busemann functions in the bordification of the space.

If  is a proper metric space, Gromov's compactification can be defined as follows. The space  can be topologised by the seminorms , the topology of uniform convergence on compacta. This is the topology induced by the natural map of C(X) into the direct product of the Banach spaces . It is give by the metric .

The space  is embedded into  by sending  to the function . Then  is compact (metrisable) and contains  as an open subset; moreover compactifications arising from different choices of basepoint are naturally homeomorphic. Let .

When  is a Hadamard manifold (or more generally a proper Hadamard space), Gromov's ideal boundary  can be realised explicitly as "asymptotic limits" of geodesics by using Busemann functions. If  is the corresponding Busemann function, then

Quasigeodesics in the Poincaré disk, CAT(-1) and hyperbolic spaces

Morse–Mostow lemma
In the case of spaces of negative curvature, such as the Poincaré disk, CAT(-1) and hyperbolic spaces, there is a metric structure on their Gromov boundary. This structure is preserved by the group of quasi-isometries which carry geodesics rays to quasigeodesic rays. Quasigeodesics were first studied for negatively curved surfaces—in particular the hyperbolic upper halfplane and unit disk—by Morse and generalised to negatively curved symmetric spaces by Mostow, for his work on the rigidity of discrete groups. The basic result is the Morse–Mostow lemma on the stability of geodesics.

The following result is essentially due to Marston Morse (1924).

Morse's lemma on stability of geodesics.

Classical proof for Poincaré disk

The classical proof of Morse's lemma for the Poincaré unit disk or upper halfplane proceeds more directly by using orthogonal projection onto the geodesic segment.

It can be assumed that Γ satisfies the stronger "pseudo-geodesic" condition:

The lower bound is automatic at the endpoints of intervals.

Hence the hypothesis implies , so that

Let  be the geodesic line containing the geodesic segment . Then

Then

since

Gromov's proof for Poincaré disk 
The generalisation of Morse's lemma to CAT(-1) spaces is often referred to as the Morse–Mostow lemma and can be proved by a straightforward generalisation of the classical proof. There is also a generalisation for the more general class of hyperbolic metric spaces due to Gromov. Gromov's proof is given below for the Poincaré unit disk; the properties of hyperbolic metric spaces are developed in the course of the proof, so that it applies mutatis mutandi to CAT(-1) or hyperbolic metric spaces.

Now the incircle of a geodesic triangle has diameter less than  where ; indeed it is strictly maximised by that of an ideal triangle where it equals . A simple induction argument shows that a geodesic polygon with  vertices for  has each side within a  neighbourhood of the other sides (such a polygon is made by combining two geodesic polygons with  sides along a common side). Hence if , the same estimate holds for a polygon with  sides.

This is a continuous function non-zero on  so attains its maximum  at some point  in this segment.

Hence , so that . The minimum number  of points in such a sequence satisfies . Take , so that the -neighbourhood of  does not contain all the other sides of the polygon. Hence, from the result above, it follows that . Hence

But then , so .

Extension to quasigeodesic rays and lines

In particular this implies the following:

A similar result holds for quasigeodesic and geodesic lines.

The assertion for quasigeodesic lines follows by taking  corresponding to the geodesic segment .

Efremovich–Tikhomirova theorem 
Before discussing CAT(-1) spaces, this section will describe the Efremovich–Tikhomirova theorem for the unit disk  with the Poincaré metric. It asserts that quasi-isometries of  extend to quasi-Möbius homeomorphisms of the unit disk with the Euclidean metric. The theorem forms the prototype for the more general theory of CAT(-1) spaces.

Extension of quasi-isometries to boundary 
If  is the Poincaré unit disk, or more generally a CAT(-1) space, the Morse lemma on stability of quasigeodesics implies that every quasi-isometry of  extends uniquely to the boundary.

Note that quasi-inverses are unique up to quasi-equivalence; that equivalent definition could be given using possibly different right and left-quasi inverses, but they would necessarily be quasi-equivalent; that quasi-isometries are closed under composition which up to quasi-equivalence depends only the quasi-equivalence classes; and that, modulo quasi-equivalence, the quasi-isometries form a group.

These visual metrics can be defined in terms of Busemann functions.

In the case of the unit disk, Teichmüller theory implies that the homomorphism carries quasiconformal homeomorphisms of the disk onto the group of quasi-Möbius homeomorphisms of the circle (using for example the Ahlfors–Beurling or Douady–Earle extension): it follows that the homomorphism from the quasi-isometry group into the quasi-Möbius group is surjective.

In the other direction, it is straightforward to prove that the homomorphism is injective. Suppose that  is a quasi-isometry of the unit disk such that  is the identity. Applying a Möbius transformation, it can be assumed that  is at the origin of the unit disk and the geodesics are the real and imaginary axes. By convexity, the -neighbourhoods of these axes intersect in a -neighbourhood of the origin: if  lies in both neighbourhoods, let  and  be the orthogonal projections of  onto the - and -axes; then  so taking projections onto the -axis, ; hence  . Hence , so that  is quasi-equivalent to the identity, as claimed.

Cross ratio and distance between non-intersecting geodesic lines
Given two distinct points  on the unit circle or real axis there is a unique hyperbolic geodesic  joining them. It is given by the circle (or straight line) which cuts the unit circle unit circle or real axis orthogonally at those two points. Given four distinct points  in the extended complex plane their cross ratio is defined by

If  is a complex Möbius transformation then it leaves the cross ratio invariant: . Since the Möbius group acts simply transitively on triples of points, the cross ratio can alternatively be described as the complex number  in  such that  for a Möbius transformation .

Now let  be points on the unit circle or real axis in that order. Then the geodesics  and  do not intersect and the distance between these geodesics is well defined: there is a unique geodesic line cutting these two geodesics orthogonally and the distance is given by the length of the geodesic segment between them. It is evidently invariant under real Möbius transformations. To compare the cross ratio and the distance between geodesics, Möbius invariance allows the calculation to be reduced to a symmetric configuration. For , take . Then
 where . Let , then , so that there is a constant  such that, if , then

Note that  are in order around the unit circle if and only if .

A more general and precise geometric interpretation of the cross ratio can be given using projections of ideal points on to a geodesic line; it does not depend on the order of the points on the circle and therefore whether or not geodesic lines intersect.

So the left hand side equals .

Proof of theorem
A homeomorphism  of the circle is quasisymmetric if there are constants  such that

It is quasi-Möbius is there are constants  such that

where

denotes the cross-ratio.

It is immediate that quasisymmetric and quasi-Möbius homeomorphisms are closed under the operations of inversion and composition.

Conversely any quasi-Möbius homeomorphism  is quasisymmetric. To see this, it can be first be checked that  (and hence ) is Hölder continuous. To prove a Hölder estimate, it can be assumed that  is uniformly small. To summarise:

 A homeomorphism of the circle is quasi-Möbius if and only if it is quasisymmetric. In this case it and its inverse are Hölder continuous. The quasi-Möbius homeomorphisms form a group under composition.

To prove the theorem it suffices to prove that if  then there are constants  such that for  distinct points on the unit circle

It has already been checked that  (and is inverse) are continuous. Composing , and hence , with complex conjugation if necessary, it can further be assumed that  preserves the orientation of the circle. In this case

To prove this, it suffices to show that . From the previous section it suffices show .
realising .

Hence the same inequalities are valid for the three cyclic of the quadruple . If both pairs are switched, the cross ratio remains unaltered. Hence the inequalities are also valid in this case. Hence again the same inequalities are valid.

Busemann functions and visual metrics for CAT(-1) spaces

Busemann functions can be used to determine special visual metrics on the class of CAT(-1) spaces. These are complete geodesic metric spaces in which the distances between points on the boundary of a geodesic triangle are less than or equal to the comparison triangle in the hyperbolic upper half plane or equivalently the unit disk with the Poincaré metric. In the case of the unit disk the chordal metric can be recovered directly using Busemann functions  and the special theory for the disk generalises completely to any proper CAT(-1) space . The hyperbolic upper half plane is a CAT(0) space, as lengths in a hyperbolic geodesic triangle are less than lengths in the Euclidean comparison triangle: in particular a CAT(-1) space is a CAT(0) space, so the theory of Busemann functions and the Gromov boundary applies. From the theory of the hyperbolic disk, it follows in particular that every geodesic ray in a CAT(-1) space extends to a geodesic line and given two points of the boundary there is a unique geodesic  such that has these points as the limits . On the hyperbolic unit disk  quasi-isometries of  induce quasi-Möbius homeomorphisms of the boundary in a functorial way. There is a more general theory of Gromov hyperbolic spaces, a similar statement holds, but with less precise control on the homeomorphisms of the boundary.

Example: Poincaré disk

Applications in percolation theory

More recently Busemann functions have been used by probabilists to study asymptotic properties in models of first-passage percolation and directed last-passage percolation.

Notes

References

, Appendix.

Geometry